The 4NCL, or Four Nations Chess League, is a chess league in the United Kingdom and named after its four nations: England, Scotland, Wales, and Northern Ireland. However, the league is international, with players from as many as 27 different countries taking part. It is the United Kingdom's foremost chess league, run independently as a limited company and outside of the control of the individual nations' chess governing bodies.

The format of the 4NCL might be described as a prestigious team tournament, held annually, over a number of weekends (October through May), at a variety of venues in the South and Midlands of England. It is run on a league basis, containing four divisions and about 600 players. As an event, it is in many ways comparable to the French Nationale and long established German Bundesliga.

As of June 2019, over 850 players are registered to take part in the 4NCL team tournament.

Some prize money is on offer, but the top teams seek to attract outside sponsorship and this occasionally allows them to secure the services of the world's leading grandmasters, typically for critical end of season clashes. Players of the calibre of Michael Adams, Nigel Short, Viktor Korchnoi, Alexander Morozevich, Alexei Shirov and Peter Svidler have participated in recent years.

At one point, John Richards was Bristol 4NCL Manager.

External links 
4NCL
4NCL history 1993-2013 from OlimpBase

References

Chess competitions
Chess in the United Kingdom
Chess in Ireland
Chess in Scotland